Joseph Saurin (1 September 1659, in Courthézon – 29 December 1737, in Paris) was a French mathematician and a converted Protestant minister. He was the first to show how the tangents at the multiple points of curves could be determined by mathematical analysis. He was accused in 1712 by Jean-Baptiste Rousseau of being the actual author of defamatory verses that gossip had attributed to Rousseau.

He was the father of Bernard-Joseph Saurin.

Bibliography 

 Samuel Baur: Neues Historisch-Biographisch-Literarisches Handwörterbuch der größten Personen aller Zeiten. 4th ed., Stettinische Buchhhandlung, Ulm 1809, p. 860

1659 births
1737 deaths
17th-century French mathematicians
18th-century French mathematicians
Members of the French Academy of Sciences